Tansa can refer to:
Tansa River near Mumbai, India
Tansa Dam on Tansa River near Mumbai, India
Tansa, Iași, a commune in Romania
Tansa, a village in Belcești Commune, Iaşi County, Romania